The Badger Hills el. , is a set of hills in Big Horn County, Montana.

See also
 List of mountain ranges in Montana

Notes

Mountain ranges of Montana
Landforms of Big Horn County, Montana